Ketan Karande (born 7 April 1978) is an Indian actor who gained popularity by playing Bhima in Sony TV's TV show Suryaputra Karn and Ghatotkacha in Mahabharat(2013 TV series).Ketan has also shared screen with Amitabh Bachchan and Amir Khan in Thugs Of Hindostan and Ajay Devgn in Action Jackson where he played important roles in both films.

Filmography

Television

Films

References

External links
 

1978 births
Indian male television actors
Living people
Indian male actors
21st-century Indian actors
Male actors from Mumbai